Another Way, is a 1982 Hungarian film directed by Károly Makk about an affair between two women. It is based on a semi-autobiographical novella Another Love (Törvényen belül) by Erzsébet Galgóczi (1930–1989), who co-wrote the screenplay with Makk. It won the Best Actress award at the 1982 Cannes Film Festival for Jadwiga Jankowska-Cieślak and was nominated for the Palme d'Or.

The film was a notable cult film for lesbian audiences in Cold War Hungary and Poland.

Plot
At Christmas 1958 in Hungary, the body of Éva Szalánczky, an apparent murder victim, is recovered from a forest. In hospital, Livia Horváth, bandaged around her neck is recuperating, and is told that she will be unable to live her life as before; the reason is not made explicit.

The lesbian Éva, already known to the authorities for her private life,  begins a new job as a journalist at The Truth, a weekly periodical, and meets the married Livia when the two women share an office. The attraction is immediate, but Livia is initially resistant. Late at night, while kissing in darkness on a park bench, the women are discovered by a policeman, who warns Livia that her husband and employer will be informed if she is found in the same uncompromising position again. Éva is arrested, but soon released.

At a collective farm, Éva finds the authorities have blocked an attempt at a more democratic way of organising their cooperative venture. Her understanding editor, a supporter of the short-lived government of the recently executed Imre Nagy, refuses to publish the article, and she resigns before she is sacked. Éva and Livia have a brief affair. The previously mild Dönci Horváth, an army officer, shoots his wife while she in the bath after her confession of love for Éva. Livia survives and her husband is imprisoned for the offence. At the hospital, Livia rejects Éva, who then journeys to the countryside. At night, Éva is challenged to stop walking by border guards, but is shot dead when she fails to do.

Cast 
The two main characters are played by Polish actresses Jadwiga Jankowska-Cieślak and Grażyna Szapołowska. They actually performed their parts in Polish throughout but in the released film their voices were dubbed into Hungarian by Ildikó Bánsági and Judit Hernádi respectively.
 Jadwiga Jankowska-Cieślak as  Éva Szalánczky
 Ildikó Bánsági as Éva Szalánczky (voice)
 Grażyna Szapołowska as Livia Horváth
 Judit Hernádi as Livia Horváth (voice)
 Jozef Kroner as Erdős
 Gyula Szabó as Erdős (voice)
 Péter Andorai as Dönci Horváth, Lívia's husband

References

External links 
 

1982 films
1982 LGBT-related films
Films directed by Károly Makk
1980s Hungarian-language films
1982 drama films
Hungarian LGBT-related films
Lesbian-related films
Films based on Hungarian novels
Hungarian drama films
LGBT-related drama films
Films set in 1958